State Route 205 (SR 205) is part of Maine's system of numbered state highways, located in Aroostook County. It runs from SR 167 in Presque Isle to SR 161 in Caribou, running parallel with and to the east of Aroostook River.

Junction list

References

External links

Floodgap Roadgap's RoadsAroundME: Maine State Route 205

205
Transportation in Aroostook County, Maine